The 1985 PGA Championship was the 67th PGA Championship, held August 8–11 at Cherry Hills Country Club in Cherry Hills Village, Colorado, a suburb south of Denver. Hubert Green won his second major title, two strokes ahead of defending champion Lee Trevino. It was Green's 19th and final victory on the PGA Tour.

Trevino led after 36 holes at 134 (−8), but a 75 (+4) on Saturday allowed Green to take the lead at 206 (−7), three strokes ahead. An eagle on Sunday at the fifth hole gave the 45-year-old Trevino a one stroke lead, but four three-putts produced an even-par round with six bogeys. The two were tied as late as the 15th tee; Green continued making pars, while Trevino bogeyed 15 and 17. Trevino admitted that the $50 heavy putter which helped him  win in 1984 on wetter, softer greens in Alabama hurt him on the drier, faster greens in Colorado, especially on Sunday.

This was the fifth major championship at Cherry Hills, which hosted the PGA Championship in 1941 and the U.S. Open in 1938, 1960, and 1978. As of 2022, it is the most recent major played in the Mountain time zone.

Course layout

Source:

Lengths of the course for previous major championships:
, par 71 - 1978 U.S. Open
, par 71 - 1960 U.S. Open
, par 71 - 1941 PGA Championship
, par 71 - 1938 U.S. Open

Round summaries

First round
Thursday, August 8, 1985

Source:

Second round
Friday, August 9, 1985

Source:

Third round
Saturday, August 10, 1985

Source:

Final round
Sunday, August 11, 1985

Source:

Scorecard

Final round

Cumulative tournament scores, relative to par
Source:

References

External links
GolfCompendium.com – 1985 PGA Championship
PGA.com – 1985 PGA Championship

Cherry Hills Country Club

PGA Championship
Golf in Colorado
Sports competitions in Denver
Englewood, Colorado
PGA Championship
PGA Championship
PGA Championship
PGA Championship
1980s in Denver